Mukachevo radar station is a Ukrainian radar station, originally built during the Soviet period for providing early warning of ballistic missile attack. Currently it is the property of the State Space Agency of Ukraine.  It is located in Shipka in the far south west of Ukraine and was part of the Soviet, and then Russian missile attack warning system. Information from this station could be used for a launch on warning nuclear missile attack or to engage the A-135 anti-ballistic missile system.

Radar

The radar is a Dnepr (NATO name: HEN HOUSE) phased array radar, and was the last one of this type to be built by the Soviet Union. It consists of a central building and two long wings over 250 metres long; each wing is a separate radar array. One had an azimuth of 196° (south west) and the other 260° (facing west).

The radar started to be built in the early 1970s. Some sources say that it started operating in 1977, others say it became operational on 16 January 1979.

It was planned that this would replace the Dnepr but construction stopped in 1991, when the Soviet Union collapsed, and never restarted. The azimuth of the Daryal was 218° (south west).

Dispute with Ukraine
In 1991 the Soviet Union collapsed and the station ended up in the newly independent country of Ukraine, together with the radar in Sevastopol. Russia signed a 15-year agreement with Ukraine in 1992  to rent both radars for $840,000 per year, although unlike other overseas stations the radar was to be staffed by Ukrainians not Russians. In 2005 management of the radars transferred from the military to the civil Ukrainian National Space Agency and the rent increased to $1.3 million, although Ukraine asked for more.

In 2008 Russia decided to stop using information from the two Ukrainian radar stations. According to some commentators this was partly due to the then Ukrainian government's stated intention to join NATO. In 2007 Vladimir Popovkin had stated that Russia intended to duplicate or replace foreign radar stations as it could not rely on them in times of crisis. Replacing the station would reduce any leverage Ukraine was gaining over Russia from the ability to control access to the data.

Pragmatic reasons were given for ending the lease. Popovkin said that the radars went out of warranty in 2005, and would cost $20m to modernise. In addition Russia said that the data from Sevastopol was unreliable due to pirate radio broadcasts from fishing boats in the Black Sea. Furthermore, it had concerns with the quality of the data due to the civilian rather than military operators.

Data from Ukraine stopped on 26 February 2009 and Russia declared that a new Voronezh radar station in Armavir had begun operation on the same date, replacing the lost coverage. Following this the Ukrainian government announced that the stations would be closed for a month for maintenance and then used part-time for space surveillance, being part of an organisation called SKAKO (Automatic System of Control and Analysis of Outer Space).

See also
 Mukachevo (air base)
 Shipka (military base)

External links
Set of photographs from both sites

References

Buildings and structures in Mukacheve
Russian and Soviet military radars
Military installations of Ukraine
State Space Agency of Ukraine